Omar Nawar (born August 30, 1998) is an international freestyle wrestler. He was born in the United States and attended Clovis West High School

NCAA Ban
Nawar’s Athletic eligibility with the National Collegiate Athletic Association was put on a freeze unrelated to drugs or performance enhancement.

References 

 FILA Database
 
 https://www.ncaa.org/champion/wrestling-away-troubled-past

1996 births
Living people